I72 can refer to:
 Interstate 72
 HMS Unicorn (I72)
 Westfield Airport